
Gmina Kamionka Wielka is a rural gmina (administrative district) in Nowy Sącz County, Lesser Poland Voivodeship, in southern Poland.

Villages
Gmina Kamionka Wielka contains the villages and settlements of Bogusza, Jamnica, Kamionka Mała, Kamionka Wielka, Królowa Górna, Królowa Polska, Mszalnica, Mystków and Zagóry.

Neighbouring gminas
Gmina Kamionka Wielka is bordered by the city of Nowy Sącz and by the gminas of Chełmiec, Grybów, Łabowa and Nawojowa.

References
Polish official population figures 2006

Kamionka Wielka
Nowy Sącz County